The 2019–20 season is Académica's fourth season in the LigaPro. This season they will also take part in the Taça de Portugal and Taça da Liga.

Pre-season and friendlies

Competitions

Overall record

LigaPro

League table

Results by round

Matches

Taça de Portugal

Second round

Third round

Fourth round

Taça da Liga

First round

Second round

Players

Appearances and goals

{| class="wikitable" style="text-align:center; text-align:center; width:95%"
! rowspan="2" style="vertical-align:center; style=" |
! rowspan="2" style="vertical-align:center; style=" |
! rowspan="2" style="vertical-align:center; style=" |
! rowspan="2" style="vertical-align:center;" |Player
! colspan="3" style="width:85px;" |Primeira Liga
! colspan="3" style="width:85px;" |Taça de Portugal
! colspan="3" style="width:85px;" |Taça da Liga
! colspan="3" style="width:85px;" |Total
|-
!
!
!
!
!
!
!
!
!
!
!
!
|-
| align="right" |1
| align="center" |GK
| align="center" |
| align="left" |Daniel Azevedo
|0||0||0
||0||0||0
||0||0||0
!0!!0!!0
|-
| align="right" |4
| align="center" |DF
| align="center" |
| align="left" |Silvério
|10||2||3
||2||0||0
||2||0||0
!14!!2!!3
|-
| align="right" |5
| align="center" |DF
| align="center" |
| align="left" |Mauro Cerqueira
|15||1||0
||3||0||0
||2||0||0
!20!!1!!0
|-
| align="right" |6
| align="center" |MF
| align="center" |
| align="left" |Ricardo Dias
|16||0||2
||3||0||0
||0||0||0
!19!!0!!2
|-
| align="right" |8
| align="center" |MF
| align="center" |
| align="left" |Hwang Mun-ki
|8||2||0
||1||0||1
||2||0||0
!11!!2!!1
|-
| align="right" |10
| align="center" |MF
| align="center" |
| align="left" |Leandro Silva
|9||6||0
||1||2||0
||2||0||0
!12!!8!!0
|-
| align="right" |16
| align="center" |MF
| align="center" |
| align="left" |João Mendes
|12||3||1
||2||0||0
||0||0||0
!14!!3!!1
|-
| align="right" |17
| align="center" |FW
| align="center" |
| align="left" |Barnes Osei
|16||1||2
||3||0||0
||2||0||0
!21!!1!!2
|-
| align="right" |19
| align="center" |FW
| align="center" |
| align="left" |Daniel Costa
|0||4||0
||0||0||0
||0||2||0
!0!!6!!0
|-
| align="right" |20
| align="center" |FW
| align="center" |
| align="left" |João Traquina
|8||3||3
||1||2||0
||0||0||0
!9!!5!!3
|-
| align="right" |22
| align="center" |MF
| align="center" |
| align="left" |Filipe Chaby
|9||3||2
||0||1||0
||2||0||0
!11!!4!!2
|-
| align="right" |23
| align="center" |DF
| align="center" |
| align="left" |Mike Moura
|17||0||2
||3||0||0
||1||0||0
!21!!0!!2
|-
| align="right" |24
| align="center" |GK
| align="center" |
| align="left" |Tiago Pereira
|6||0||-8
||0||0||0
||2||0||-3
!8!!0!!-11
|-
| align="right" |27
| align="center" |MF
| align="center" |
| align="left" |Derik Lacerda
|9||1||2
||2||1||0
||0||0||0
!11!!2!!2
|-
| align="right" |31
| align="center" |MF
| align="center" |
| align="left" |Marcos Paulo
|12||3||1
||3||0||0
||0||1||0
!15!!4!!1
|-
| align="right" |33
| align="center" |DF
| align="center" |
| align="left" |António Ribeiro
|0||0||0
||0||0||0
||0||0||0
!0!!0!!0
|-
| align="right" |34
| align="center" |DF
| align="center" |
| align="left" |Zé Maria
|0||0||0
||0||0||0
||0||0||0
!0!!0!!0
|-
| align="right" |35
| align="center" |DF
| align="center" |
| align="left" |Sérgio Conceição
|1||0||0
||0||0||0
||0||0||0
!1!!0!!0
|-
| align="right" |39
| align="center" |FW
| align="center" |
| align="left" |Donald Djoussé
|4||7||3
||0||2||1
||0||0||0
!4!!9!!4
|-
| align="right" |55
| align="center" |DF
| align="center" |
| align="left" |Arghus
|7||2||0
||1||0||1
||0||0||0
!8!!2!!1
|-
| align="right" |65
| align="center" |MF
| align="center" |
| align="left" |Fernando Alexandre
|0||0||0
||0||0||0
||0||0||0
!0!!0!!0
|-
| align="right" |66
| align="center" |MF
| align="center" |
| align="left" |João Lameira
|0||0||0
||0||0||0
||0||0||0
!0!!0!!0
|-
| align="right" |74
| align="center" |DF
| align="center" |
| align="left" |Francisco Moura
|4||0||1
||0||0||0
||0||0||0
!4!!0!!1
|-
| align="right" |77
| align="center" |FW
| align="center" |
| align="left" |Brito
|0||0||0
||0||0||0
||0||0||0
!0!!0!!0
|-
| align="right" |83
| align="center" |DF
| align="center" |
| align="left" |Zé Castro
|12||0||3
||3||0||0
||2||0||0
!17!!0!!3
|-
| align="right" |88
| align="center" |MF
| align="center" |
| align="left" |Pedro Pinto
|0||1||0
||0||0||0
||0||0||0
!0!!1!!0
|-
| align="right" |91
| align="center" |GK
| align="center" |
| align="left" |Mika
|12||0||-15
||3||0||-3
||0||0||0
!15!!0!!-18
|-
! colspan="22" style="background:#eaecf0; text-align:center;"| Players transferred out during the season
|-
| align="right" |9
| align="center" |FW
| align="center" |
| align="left" |Hugo Almeida
|2||8||1
||1||1||0
||1||1||0
!4!!10!!1
|-
| align="right" |11
| align="center" |FW
| align="center" |
| align="left" |Romário Correia
|0||1||0
||0||0||0
||0||0||0
!0!!1!!0
|-
| align="right" |15
| align="center" |DF
| align="center" |
| align="left" |Matheus Mancini
|0||0||0
||0||0||0
||0||0||0
!0!!0!!0
|-
| align="right" |18
| align="center" |FW
| align="center" |
| align="left" |André Claro
|2||0||1
||0||0||0
||1||1||0
!3!!1!!1
|-
| align="right" |21
| align="center" |FW
| align="center" |
| align="left" |Daniel Mantilla
|0||0||0
||0||0||0
||0||0||0
!0!!0!!0
|-
| align="right" |28
| align="center" |MF
| align="center" |
| align="left" |Reko
|0||0||0
||0||0||0
||2||0||1
!2!!0!!1
|-
| align="right" |30
| align="center" |MF
| align="center" |
| align="left" |David Teles
|0||0||0
||0||0||0
||0||1||0
!0!!1!!0
|-
| align="right" |44
| align="center" |DF
| align="center" |
| align="left" |Yuri Matias
|2||1||0
||0||0||0
||0||0||0
!2!!1!!0
|-
| align="right" |75
| align="center" |FW
| align="center" |
| align="left" |Tafsir Chérif
|0||3||0
||1||0||0
||0||0||0
!1!!3!!0
|-
| align="right" |90
| align="center" |GK
| align="center" |
| align="left" |Júlio Neiva
|0||0||0
||0||0||0
||0||0||0
!0!!0!!0

Transfers

Summer

In

Out

Winter

In

Out

Coaching staff

References

2019-20
Portuguese football clubs 2019–20 season